This is a list of seasons played by Burgos CF in Spanish football, from 1994 to the most recent completed season. It details the club's achievements in major competitions, and the top scorers in league games for each season.

Key

Key to league record
 Pos = Final position
 Pld = Games played
 W = Games won
 D = Games drawn
 L = Games lost
 GF = Goals for
 GA = Goals against
 Pts = Points

Key to rounds
 W = Winner
 RU = Runner-up
 SF = Semi-finals
 QF = Quarter-finals
 R16 = Round of 16
 R32 = Round of 32
 R64 = Round of 64

 R6 = Sixth round
 R5 = Fifth round
 R4 = Fourth round
 R3 = Third round
 R2 = Second round
 R1 = First round
 GS = Group stage
 QR = Qualifying round

Seasons

Notes

External links
Statistics at AupaBurgos.com
Profile at BDFútbol
Profile at Futbolme.com

Seasons
Burgos
Seasons